The Cocoon and the Butterfly is a 1914 American silent short drama film directed by Sydney Ayres, starring  William Garwood and Louise Lester.

Cast
William Garwood 
Louise Lester	
Afton Minear
Jack Richardson
Vivian Rich
William Tedmarsh
Harry Van Meter

External links

1914 drama films
1914 films
Silent American drama films
American silent short films
American black-and-white films
1914 short films
Films directed by Sydney Ayres
1910s American films